Gonatodes ligiae is a species of lizard in the Sphaerodactylidae family found in Venezuela.

References

Gonatodes
Reptiles described in 1967